The JMEV Yi, also known as the Mobilize Limo, is a battery electric small family car (C-segment), produced by the French car manufacturer Renault through its subsidiary Mobilize, in a joint venture with Jiangling Motors Corporation Group through JMEV. It was presented at the International Motor Show Germany in September 2021 and is available from 2022 exclusively for car-sharing or taxi.

Background
Mobilize is a brand of the Renault group dedicated to passenger transport, such as vehicles reserved only for professional drivers (especially taxi drivers) or car-sharing.

The first Mobilize Limo fleet (of 40 units) is put into service in mid-2022 by Cabify.

Overview

In September 2021, Renault announced its intention to market the Yi in Europe as a subscription-only vehicle for professional drivers, under the name Mobilize Limo.

Safety

Euro NCAP
The Mobilize Limo in its standard European configuration received 4 stars from Euro NCAP in 2022.

References

External links

Euro NCAP small family cars
Electric car models
Cars introduced in 2021
First car made by manufacturer